Nassim Zitouni (born 31 March 1994) is a French-Algerian professional footballer who plays as a midfielder for French Championnat National 3 team SO Châtellerault. 

Zitouni became the first ever player to receive a call-up to the French national U18 team whilst playing at amateur level, when he was called-up while playing at AS Saint-Priest.

Honours

Player

Club
Porto B
LigaPro: 2015–16

References

External links
Nassim Zitouni at Footballdatabase

Living people
1994 births
Algerian footballers
Algerian expatriate footballers
Algerian expatriate sportspeople in France
Algerian expatriate sportspeople in Portugal
Expatriate footballers in Portugal
Algerian expatriate sportspeople in Bulgaria
Expatriate footballers in Bulgaria
Primeira Liga players
Liga Portugal 2 players
First Professional Football League (Bulgaria) players
Premier League of Bosnia and Herzegovina players
Vitória S.C. players
FC Porto B players
FC Dunav Ruse players
FK Tuzla City players
US Granville players
ASC Biesheim players
SO Châtellerault players
French sportspeople of Algerian descent
Footballers from Sétif
Association football midfielders
Algerian Ligue Professionnelle 1 players